Ghast may refer to:

 Creatures in H.P. Lovecraft novella The Dream-Quest of Unknown Kadath
 Ghast (Dungeons & Dragons), undead creatures in the Dungeons & Dragons role-playing game
 A character in the Wardstone Chronicles
 Cliff-ghasts, creatures in the His Dark Materials trilogy
 Ghasts, a nether monster in the video game Minecraft

See also
 Ghastly (disambiguation)